Mike Wilmot is a Canadian stand-up comedian represented by Off the Kerb. In 2005 he won two Canadian Comedy Awards for best male stand-up and best actor for his work in It's All Gone Pete Tong.

In addition to It's All Gone Pete Tong, Wilmot has appeared on Corner Gas, British TV shows such as Never Mind the Buzzcocks, and alongside American comedian Rich Hall in BBC television series Rich Hall's Fishing Show and Rich Hall's Cattle Drive. He was the host of the Paramount comedy series Comedy Blue. He has also appeared on the Australian TV show Good News Week (Network 10) as a guest panelist and visits Australia annually to perform at the Melbourne International Comedy Festival.

In 2009, he starred as Michael Valmont-Selkirk, the crooked and corrupt director of a philanthropic foundation in the Canadian TV series The Foundation.

Filmography

Awards and nominations

References

External links
 Official website
 
 Mike Wilmot - Off the Kerb Productions

Year of birth missing (living people)
Living people
Canadian stand-up comedians
Canadian male television actors
Comedians from Toronto
Male actors from Toronto
Canadian Comedy Award winners